Pseudofumaria lutea (syn. Corydalis lutea), the yellow corydalis or rock fumewort, is a short-lived perennial plant in the poppy family Papaveraceae. It is native to the southern foothills of the south-western and central Alps of Italy and Switzerland, but widely introduced elsewhere.

Characteristics 
Leaves are finely divided and yellow-green to gray-green, often remaining over winter.

They have 4 petals; the top and bottom ones crested, the top one with a short, rounded spur curved downwards, the 2 inner ones connected at the tip.

Its seeds, dark brown with white elaiosomes, are held in oval, flat pods. Plants self-seed abundantly.

Cultivation

Yellow corydalis is hardy to –34 °C (-30 °F; hardiness zone 4). It does best in light shade with good moisture, but will tolerate both full sun and deep shade. It grows wild in cracks in old walls where drainage is excellent.

References

External links

 Flora Europaea
 Missouri Botanical Garden (Corydalis lutea)
 UK Wildflowers
  Botanischer Garten Bochum (Corydalis lutea)

Fumarioideae
Flora of Europe
Flora of the Alps
Garden plants